When the Bough Breaks is a 1973 novel by Lois Duncan. In addition to Point of Violence (1966), it is one of two adult novels she composed, with the majority of her publications being young adult fiction.

References

External links
When the Bough Breaks at the Open Library

1973 American novels
Novels by Lois Duncan
Doubleday (publisher) books